Martin James Hewitt,  (born 23 March 1966) is a senior British police officer, who has served as Chairman of the National Police Chiefs' Council since May 2019.

Early life and education
Hewitt was born on 23 March 1966 in London, England. He was educated at the Salesian College, Battersea, an all-boys Catholic grammar school in London. He would later attend the University of Leicester, completing a postgraduate diploma in criminal justice studies in 2000.

Hewitt's first career was in the military, serving in the British Army for seven years. Having attended the Royal Military Academy Sandhurst, he was commissioned into the Royal Artillery as a second lieutenant on 11 April 1987. He was promoted to lieutenant on 11 April 1989. He was transferred to the reserve of officers on 31 January 1993, thereby ending his active service.

Police career
Hewitt moved to the police, joining Kent Police in 1993 and transferring to the Metropolitan Police in 2005. He was awarded the Queen's Police Medal in 2014. He was the Metropolitan Police's Assistant Commissioner (Professionalism) until April 2016, when he became Assistant Commissioner (Territorial Policing). That role was renamed Assistant Commissioner Frontline Policing in 2018, and he held it until the end of that year.

He had been deputy chair of the National Police Chiefs' Council (NPCC) since 2015. He took up his role as chair of the NPCC in April 2019, succeeding Sara Thornton, and with Mark Simmons succeeding him as Assistant Commissioner Frontline Policing. He has also led national-level police responses to kidnap and adult sexual offences. His first interview, in January 2020, as head of the NPCC lays out his approach. During the COVID-19 pandemic, he spoke as part of the government's team for daily briefings.

Personal life 

Hewitt is divorced, with four children.

Honours

References

 

Assistant Commissioners of Police of the Metropolis
Royal Artillery officers
Living people
English recipients of the Queen's Police Medal
Metropolitan Police recipients of the Queen's Police Medal
1966 births
Graduates of the Royal Military Academy Sandhurst